Hin Son railway station is a railway station located in Hin Son Subdistrict, Kaeng Khoi District, Saraburi Province.

References 

Railway stations in Thailand
Saraburi province